St. Raymond's Cathedral may refer to:

United States
Cathedral of St. Raymond Nonnatus, Joliet, Illinois
St. Raymond Maronite Cathedral (St. Louis, Missouri)